The Pilgrim's Regress is a book of allegorical fiction by C. S. Lewis. 
This 1933 novel was Lewis's first published work of prose fiction, and his third piece of work to be published and first after he converted to Christianity. It charts the progress of a fictional character named John through a philosophical landscape in search of the Island of his desire.  Lewis described the novel to his publisher as "a kind of Bunyan up to date," in reference to John Bunyan's 1678 novel The Pilgrim's Progress, recast with the politics, ideologies, philosophy, and aesthetic principles of the early 20th century. As such, the character struggles with the modern phoniness, hypocrisy, and intellectual vacancy of the Christian church, Communism, Fascism, and various philosophical and artistic movements.

Background and Context 
In September 1931, Lewis, Tolkien and Dyson had the famous Night of Addison’s Walk where they walked around Magdalen College discussing myth and how Christianity is the true myth.

This night served a key moment for Lewis and led to his conversion from Theism to Christianity. A year later, Lewis wrote The Pilgrim’s Regress in August 1932 while visiting the home of his longtime friend Arthur Greeves in Northern Ireland.

During the same time he wrote The Allegory of Love which wouldn't be published for several more years. Lewis was gifted with lightning fast writing and rarely wrote second drafts so he published The Pilgrim’s Regress in May 1933.

Overview of Text 
The story centers around the main character, John, who as a boy grows up in Puritania under the stern, allusive, and seemingly tyrannical Landlord.

He discovers and has visions of an island that fills indescribable yearning. At first, he thinks this yearning is Lust, personified as brown girls, but when he unmasks the mistake, he decides to flee his homeland and perceived oppressor, the Landlord, in search of the far-off island. Along the way he meets Mr. Enlightenment which is a personification of 19th century rationalism. He invites John to join him on his travels to Claptrap but John decides to continue his search for the Island.

In the cities of Thrill and Eschropolis (meaning an ugly city in Greek), he meets personifications of romantic love, the modern literary movement and Freudianism. He thinks he found the island through aesthetic experience, but damaged by these characters and seeing his error he abandons the cities. Eventually, the Spirit of the Age captures John. The spirit is drawn as a giant whose gaze makes everything transparent. So when he looks at John, everyone including John can see his insides i.e. bowels, stomach, lungs, etc. The giant tries to convince him that that’s all he is, but Reason, personified as a gallant woman knight, comes to the rescue to slay the Spirit of the Age. She then leads him all the way to the Grand Canyon.

As he tries to figure out how to cross, the church, personified as Mother Kirk, comes by and explains to him the reason for the canyon (which is the Sin of Adam) and that she is the only one who can get him across. He says thanks but he’ll take the long way around.

As he goes North, he meets three pale men personified as Mr. Sensible, Mr. Neo-Angluar, and Mr. Humanist who are served by a creature named Drudge. These men do not help John as they talk of seeing through things they had not even seen. He goes farther north to discover a valley filled with caves and inhabited by trolls and ruled over by a near-giant named Savage. They serve as models for Marxism and Fascists, and John leaves with an ominous warning from Savage that he will destroy the three pale men. Drudge, who left the pale men to travel with John, stays with Savage.

Turning back and going South along the road, he meets Mr. Broad who represents a “modernizing religion which is friends with the World and goes on no pilgrimages.” At last, John reaches the house of Wisdom who teaches him what is lacking from notable philosophies of the 20th century which to Lewis were the Idealist Philosophy, Materialism, and Hegelianism.

Continuing along the canyon, he runs into a Man from whom he learns that he must accept Grace or die. He had wondered if he could live by Philosophy or Pantheistic beliefs, but after accepting Grace he feels obligated to acknowledge the existence of the Landlord. He doesn’t want to do this though since he wants to call his soul his own, but if he does acknowledge the Landlord then he’ll have no privacy or superiority over anything.

After moving on from the Man he discovers a hermit named History. History tells John that not everyone has as clear visions of the Islands but they receive pictures that prove similar. Some don’t have the benefit of Mother Kirk but the Landlord stirs up pictures and sweet desires to lead them there.

John wants to leave but Reason will not let him and leads him to Mother Kirk. Mother Kirk instructs him to dive into a pool of water. John says that he doesn’t know how but then learns that diving is only the art of ceasing to do anything. After diving, he then finds the Island and discovers that it is only the other side of the Mountains which he has known his whole life in Puritania.

The Regress portion of the title now comes into play as John journeys back home and now sees everything in a new light and sees how the road he took is a knife’s edge between Heaven and Hell.

Reception and Criticisms 
The years after publication, the book found mixed reviews. George Sayer found it remarkable how acutely Lewis could diagnose and explain the weaknesses of contemporary doctrine.

Others, however, found difficulties, and Lewis wrote a preface in the third edition to help explain more of what he meant. He criticized himself for “needless obscurity and an uncharitable temper.” He also admits that he had a specific idea of Romanticism that was much different from the rest of the world's. He also mistook his protagonist, John, as a relatable everyman. He said he was wrong in thinking that most people came to Christ the way he did.

Philip and Carol Zaleski criticize Lewis for populating his book with straw men. They said that his characters were not personifications but pet peeves. This was Lewis at his least charitable and he made too strong a case for his conversion. They say the experience taught Lewis to wear his allegory a little more lightly.

References

External links

 
Notes on Quotations & Allusions in The Pilgrim's Regress
The Pilgrim's Regress: An Allegorical Apology for Christianity, Reason and Romanticism (PDF, Canadian public domain text)

British fantasy novels
Christian allegory
1933 British novels
Novels by C. S. Lewis
J. M. Dent books